The following is a hierarchical outline for the Canadian Armed Forces at the end of the Cold War. It is intended to convey the connections and relationships between units and formations.

Following the 1967 Canadian Forces Reorganization Act the Canadian Army, Royal Canadian Navy and Royal Canadian Air Force were amalgamated in 1968 as the Canadian Armed Forces. Since then the Chief of Defence Staff is directly responsible for all services and commands of the Canadian Armed Forces and advises the Canadian Government in all military matters. Policy is developed in the Armed Forces Council, which is made up of the commanders of the functional commands.

In 1989 the Canadian Armed Forces had 84,600 active personnel, 7,800 of which were female, and 21,300 reserve personnel, 4,200 of which were female. Around three quarters of all military occupation were open to women in 1989 and the government actively pursued a policy to open more occupations to women. The 1987 Defence White Paper "Challenge and Commitment" called for an expansion of the reserve forces to approximately 90,000 troops, however with the end of the Cold War this plan was shelved.

The article is based on the Canadian government's 1987 White Paper "A Defence Policy for Canada" (Link), which was published at the end of 1987. The White Paper served as basis for the overall structure and the equipment numbers. The article was then expanded with information from the Canadian Armed Forces Annual Historical Reports, which provided a complete listing of all units in existence in 1989. Additional information came from the linked Wikipedia articles, a German brochure about the Canadian Forces based in Germany (Link) and the current Canadian Armed Forces website and the unit histories listed there.

National Defence Headquarters 

 National Defence Headquarters, in Ottawa
 Communications Security Establishment, in Ottawa, signals intelligence agency
 Assistant Deputy Minister (Materiel), responsible for acquiring, introducing and supporting Canadian Armed Forces equipment
 Rescue Coordination Centres at CFB Halifax, CFB Trenton, CFB Edmonton and CFB Esquimalt
 Canadian Forces Support Unit (Ottawa)
 1 Canadian Forces Logistics Liaison Unit (Liaison with suppliers in North America)
 Canadian Defence Liaison Staff London, UK
 Canadian Defence Liaison Staff Washington, USA
 Canadian Forces Military Police
 Canadian Forces Protective Services Unit, in Ottawa
 Canadian Forces Service Prison and Detention Barracks, at CFB Edmonton
 Canadian Forces Northern Area, in Yellowknife
 Canadian Rangers, HQ in Ottawa
 1 Canadian Ranger Patrol Group covering Northwest Territories, Yukon Territory and Nunavut
 2 Canadian Ranger Patrol Group covering Northern Quebec
 3 Canadian Ranger Patrol Group covering Northern Ontario
 4 Canadian Ranger Patrol Group covering Northern Manitoba, British Columbia, Saskatchewan and Alberta
 5 Canadian Ranger Patrol Group covering Northern Newfoundland
 Defence Intelligence Office
 Canadian National Distributing Authority (Cryptography)
 Canadian Forces Photographic Unit
 Mapping and Charting Establishment
 Special Investigation Unit (Counter-Intelligence Unit)

Logistics Support Group 

 Logistics Support Group
 Aerospace Engineering Test Establishment
 Aerospace Maintenance Development Unit
 Canadian Forces Ammunition Depot Angus, at CFB Borden
 Canadian Forces Ammunition Depot Bedford, in Bedford
 Canadian Forces Ammunition Depot Dundurn, at CFAD Dundurn
 Canadian Forces Ammunition Depot Det Edmonton, at CFB Edmonton
 Canadian Forces Ammunition Depot Rocky Point, in Metchosin
 Canadian Forces Parachute Maintenance Depot, in CFB Edmonton(Greisbach)
 Canadian Forces Personnel Applied Research Unit
 Canadian Forces Postal Unit
 Canadian Forces Publications Depot
 1 Canadian Forces Supply Depot at CFB Toronto
 5 Canadian Forces Supply Depot at CFB Moncton
 7 Canadian Forces Supply Depot at CFB Edmonton
 4e Unité des mouvements de contrôle des Forces canadiennes (4 Canadian Forces Movement Control Unit), at CFB Montreal
 3e Unité de soutien du Canada (3 Canadian support unit)
 25e Dépôt d'approvisionnement des Forces canadiennes (25 Canadian Forces Supply Depot), at CFB Montreal
 202e Dépôt d'ateliers (202 Workshop Depot), at CFB Montreal
 Land Engineering Test Establishment, Orleans, Ontario
 Quality Engineering Test Establishment
 Centre d'essai et d'expérimentation (Testing and Experimentation Center)
 Centre d'essais techniques (mer) (Engineering Test Establishment (Sea))
 DND Fire Protection Service

Defence Research and Development Canada 

 Defence Research and Development Canada, in Ottawa
 Defence Research Establishment Atlantic, in Dartmouth
 Defence Research Establishment Valcartier, at CFB Valcartier
 Defence Research Establishment Ottawa – National Aeronautical Establishment, in Shirleys Bay
 Defence Research Establishment Toronto, at CFB Toronto
 Defence and Civil Institute of Environmental Medicine
 Defence Research Establishment Suffield, at CFB Suffield
 Defence Research Establishment Pacific, at CFB Esquimalt
 Operational Research Analysis Establishment

Recruiting 
 National Defence Headquarters, in Ottawa
 Canadian Forces Recruiting Zone West, in Edmonton
 Canadian Forces Recruiting Centre Calgary
 Canadian Forces Recruiting Centre Edmonton
 Detachment Yellowknife
 Canadian Forces Recruiting Centre Saskatoon
 Detachment Regina
 Canadian Forces Recruiting Centre Vancouver
 Canadian Forces Recruiting Zone Central, in Ottawa
 Canadian Forces Recruiting Centre Hamilton
 Canadian Forces Recruiting Centre London
 Canadian Forces Recruiting Centre Ottawa
 Canadian Forces Recruiting Centre Sudbury
 Canadian Forces Recruiting Centre Toronto
 Detachment Peterborough
 Zone de recrutement des Forces canadiennes Québec, in Montreal
 Centre de recrutement des Forces canadiennes Montreal
 Detachment Saint-Jérôme
 Centre de recrutement des Forces canadiennes Québec
 Centre de recrutement des Forces canadiennes Rimouski
 Détachement Sept-Îles
 Centre de recrutement des Forces canadiennes Rouyn
 Centre de recrutement des Forces canadiennes Sherbrooke
 Centre de recrutement des Forces canadiennes Trois-Rivières
 Canadian Forces Recruiting Zone Atlantic, in Halifax
 Canadian Forces Recruiting Centre Halifax
 Canadian Forces Recruiting Centre St. John's
 Canadian Forces Recruiting Centre Saint John

Mobile Command 
Mobile Command controlled all land force units based in Canada and trained and prepared ground troops for the deployment to Canadian Forces Europe. Mobile Command's major formations were two brigade groups and an ad hoc special service force. Recognisably an army formation but not under Mobile Command, 4 Canadian Mechanized Brigade Group was located in West Germany under the control of 1 Canadian Division (Forward) and Canadian Forces Europe. Mobile Command also commanded 106 major and 25 minor reserve units of the Canadian Militia. Active forces amounted to 22,500 troops with 15,500 reserve forces.

In case of war men Air Command's Air Transport Group would have flown about 1,400 men from 1 Canadian Mechanized Brigade Group to Germany to bring 4 Canadian Mechanized Brigade Group up to wartime strength, while 5 Canadian Mechanized Brigade Group would have been shipped over the Atlantic as reinforcements for 1 Canadian Division (Forward). Special Service Force would have contributed a battalion group centered around 1st Battalion, The Royal Canadian Regiment to NATO's Allied Mobile Force (Land) (AMF(L)). The Airborne Regiment was destined for defence operations in Canada.

 Canadian Forces Mobile Command, at CFB St. Hubert
 CFB Shilo
 Royal Canadian Artillery Battle School
 CFB Gagetown
 Combat Training Centre
 Armour School, 37x Leopard C1
 Field Artillery School
 Infantry School
 Army Meteorological Centre
 22 Field Squadron (Canadian Military Engineers)
 CFB Suffield training base
 CFB Wainwright training base
 CFB Edmonton (Griesbach)
 Canadian Airborne Centre
 CFB Chatham (Air Command Base)
 Air Defence Artillery School
 Canadian Land Force Command and Staff College, at CFB Kingston

1 Canadian Mechanized Brigade Group 

 1 Canadian Mechanized Brigade Group, at CFB Calgary
 1 CMBG Headquarters & Signal Squadron
 Lord Strathcona's Horse
 1st Btn, Princess Patricia's Canadian Light Infantry
 2nd Btn, Princess Patricia's Canadian Light Infantry
 3rd Btn, Princess Patricia's Canadian Light Infantry
 3rd Regiment, Royal Canadian Horse Artillery
 1st Combat Engineer Regiment
 supported by 408th Tactical Helicopter Squadron part of 10 Tactical Air Group of Air Command
 1 Service Battalion
 Princess Patricia's Canadian Light Infantry Battle School
 1 Field Ambulance
 1 Military Police Platoon

5 Canadian Mechanized Brigade Group 

 5 Groupe-brigade mécanisé du Canada, at CFB Valcartier
 5e GBMC Quartier général et escadron de transmissions
 12e Régiment blindé du Canada
 2nd Btn, Royal Canadian Regiment
 2e Btn, Royal 22e Régiment
 3e Btn, Royal 22e Regiment
 5e Régiment d'artillerie légère du Canada
 5e Régiment du génie de combat
 supported by 430e Escadron tactique d'hélicoptères part of 10 Tactical Air Group of Air Command
 5 Bataillon des services
 Royal 22e Régiment École de combat
 5e Ambulance de campagne
 5 Military Police Platoon

Special Service Force 

 Special Service Force, at CFB Petawawa
 Special Service Force Headquarters and Signal Squadron
 Royal Canadian Dragoons
 Airborne Regiment
 Airborne Headquarters and Signal Squadron
 1er Commando Aéroporte, associated with Royal 22e Régiment
 2nd Airborne Commando, associated with Princess Patricia's Canadian Light Infantry
 3rd Airborne Commando, associated with Royal Canadian Regiment
 4th Airborne Commando (Reserve, formed from a company headquarters and 2x platoons from Queen's Own Rifles of Canada and 1x platoon from Loyal Edmonton Regiment)
 5th Airborne Commando (Reserve, formed from a company headquarters and 2x platoons from Le Régiment du Saguenay and 1x platoon from Royal Westminster Regiment)
 Airborne Service Commando (providing combat service support)
 1st Btn, Royal Canadian Regiment, at CFB London
 2nd Regiment, Royal Canadian Horse Artillery, E Battery airborne qualified, 24x 105mm M 56 pack howitzers
 2 Combat Engineer Regiment, provides one airborne troop
 supported by 427th Tactical Helicopter Squadron part of 10 Tactical Air Group of Air Command
 2 Service Battalion
 Royal Canadian Regiment Battle School
 Militia Training and Support Centre
 119 Air Defense Battery, Air Defense Anti-Tank Systems
 2 Military Police Platoon

Militia 
The Militia was the primary reserve of Mobile Command and headquartered in Ottawa. Maritime and air reserve formations were part of Maritime Command, respectively Air Command, while communication reserve units were part of the Canadian Forces Communication Command. In wartime the Militia would provide ground units for defence operations in Canada and elsewhere in North America, as well as replacements for the Canadian land force units fighting in the European war theatre. The Militia would also provide lightly armed guards to protect military vital points, and make major contributions to the logistic and medical organizations required to support Canadian Forces overseas. In total the militia fielded 106 major and 25 minor units with 15,5000 men. Major units were regiments or battalions, although they seldom exceeded the strength of a company, while minor units were independent artillery batteries, and engineer squadrons. The militia was organized in five militias areas, which were subdivided into militia districts.

In case of war the Militia Areas would have become division commands with the responsibility to conduct all military ground operations in their area. In 1989 the Militia consisted of the following units:

Pacific Militia Area 
 Pacific Militia Area, in Vancouver covering British Columbia
 Victoria Militia District, in Victoria (Merged with the Vancouver Militia District in 1990)
 The British Columbia Dragoons, in Kelowna
 The Rocky Mountain Rangers, in Kamloops
 The Canadian Scottish Regiment (Princess Mary's), in Victoria
 5th (British Columbia) Field Artillery Regiment, RCA, in Victoria
 54th Field Engineer Squadron, in Chilliwack
 11 (Victoria) Service Battalion, in Victoria
 Vancouver Militia District, in Vancouver
 The British Columbia Regiment (Duke of Connaught's Own), in Vancouver
 The Royal Westminster Regiment, in New Westminster (provides 1x airborne platoon to the Airborne Regiment)
 The Seaforth Highlanders of Canada, in Vancouver
 15th Field Artillery Regiment, RCA, in Vancouver
 6th Field Engineer Squadron, in Vancouver
 17th Field Engineer Squadron, in Kimberley
 44th Field Engineer Squadron, in Trail
 12 (Vancouver) Service Battalion, in Richmond

Prairie Militia Area 
 Prairie Militia Area, in Winnipeg covering Alberta, Manitoba, Saskatchewan and Northwestern Ontario
 Southern Alberta Militia District, in Calgary (Merged with the Northern Alberta Militia District in 1989)
 The King's Own Calgary Regiment (RCAC), in Calgary
 The Calgary Highlanders, in Calgary
 14 (Calgary) Service Battalion, in Calgary
 20th Independent Field Battery, RCA, in Lethbridge Alberta
 Northern Alberta Militia District, in Edmonton
 South Alberta Light Horse, in Edmonton
 The Loyal Edmonton Regiment (4th Battalion, Princess Patricia's Canadian Light Infantry), in Edmonton (provides 1x airborne platoon to the Airborne Regiment)
 20th Field Artillery Regiment, RCA, in Edmonton
 8th Field Engineer Regiment, in Edmonton
 15 (Edmonton) Service Battalion, in Edmonton
 Saskatchewan Militia District, in Regina (Merged with the Manitoba-Lakehead Militia District in 1991)
 The Saskatchewan Dragoons, in Moose Jaw
 The North Saskatchewan Regiment, in Saskatoon
 The Royal Regina Rifles, in Regina
 10th Field Artillery Regiment, RCA, in Regina
 16 (Saskatchewan) Service Battalion, in Saskatoon and Regina
 21st Field Engineer Squadron, in Flin Flon
 Manitoba-Lakehead Militia District, in Winnipeg
 The Fort Garry Horse, in Winnipeg
 The Royal Winnipeg Rifles, in Winnipeg
 The Queen's Own Cameron Highlanders of Canada, in Winnipeg
 26th Field Artillery Regiment, RCA, in Brandon
 17 (Winnipeg) Service Battalion, in Winnipeg
 31st Field Engineer Squadron, in Winnipeg
 Thunder Bay Militia District, in Thunder Bay (Merged with the Manitoba-Lakehead Militia District in 1989)
 The Lake Superior Scottish Regiment, in Thunder Bay
 18 (Thunder Bay) Service Battalion, in Thunder Bay
 116th Independent Field Battery, RCA, in Kenora

Central Militia Area 
 Central Militia Area, in Toronto covering Ontario
 Windsor Militia District, in Windsor (Merged with the London Militia District in December 1989)
 The Windsor Regiment (RCAC), in Windsor
 The Essex and Kent Scottish, in Windsor
 21 (Windsor) Service Battalion, in Windsor
 London Militia District, in London
 1st Hussars, in London
 The Elgin Regiment (RCAC), in St. Thomas
 4th Battalion, The Royal Canadian Regiment, in London
 The Grey and Simcoe Foresters, in Owen Sound
 56th Field Artillery Regiment, RCA, in Brantford
 22 (London) Service Battalion, in London
 7th Field Engineer Squadron, in St. Thomas
 Hamilton Militia District, in Hamilton (Merged with the London Militia District)
 The Royal Hamilton Light Infantry (Wentworth Regiment), in Hamilton
 The Lincoln and Welland Regiment, in St. Catharines
 The Highland Fusiliers of Canada, in Cambridge
 The Argyll and Sutherland Highlanders of Canada (Princess Louise's), in Hamilton
 11th Field Artillery Regiment, RCA, in Guelph
 23 (Hamilton) Service Battalion, in Hamilton
 48th Field Engineer Squadron, in Waterloo
 Toronto Militia District, in Toronto
 The Governor General's Horse Guards, in Toronto
 The Queen's York Rangers (1st American Regiment) (RCAC), in Toronto
 The Queen's Own Rifles of Canada, in Toronto (provides 2x airborne platoons and a company headquarters to the Airborne Regiment)
 The Royal Regiment of Canada, in Toronto
 The Lorne Scots (Peel, Dufferin and Halton Regiment), in Brampton
 48th Highlanders of Canada, in Toronto
 The Toronto Scottish Regiment, Toronto
 7th Toronto Regiment, RCA, in Toronto
 2nd Field Engineer Regiment, in Toronto
 25 (Toronto) Service Battalion, in Toronto
 Northern Ontario Militia District, in North Bay (Merged with the Ottawa Militia District)
 The Algonquin Regiment, in North Bay
 2nd Btn, The Irish Regiment of Canada, in Sudbury
 The Lanark and Renfrew Scottish Regiment, in Pembroke
 49th Field Artillery Regiment, RCA, in Sault Ste. Marie
 26 (North Bay) Service Battalion, in North Bay
 Ottawa Militia District, in Ottawa
 The Ontario Regiment (RCAC), in Oshawa
 Governor General's Foot Guards, in Ottawa
 The Princess of Wales' Own Regiment, in Kingston
 The Hastings and Prince Edward Regiment, in Belleville
 The Brockville Rifles, in Brockville
 Stormont, Dundas and Glengarry Highlanders, in Cornwall
 The Cameron Highlanders of Ottawa, in Ottawa
 30th Field Artillery Regiment, RCA, in Ottawa
 28 (Ottawa) Service Battalion, in Ottawa
 3rd Field Engineer Squadron, in Ottawa
 5th Field Engineer Squadron, in Ottawa

Atlantic Militia Area 
 Atlantic Militia Area, in Halifax covering New Brunswick, Newfoundland, Nova Scotia, and Prince Edward Island
 Eastern New Brunswick Militia District, in Saint John
 2nd Btn, The Royal New Brunswick Regiment, in Bathurst
 31 (Saint John) Service Battalion, in Saint John
 Western New Brunswick District Militia District, in CFB Moncton (Merged with Eastern New Brunswick Militia District in 1992)
 1st Btn, The Royal New Brunswick Regiment, in Fredericton
 32 (Moncton) Service Battalion, in Moncton
 Western Nova Scotia Militia District, in Halifax
 The Princess Louise Fusiliers, in Halifax
 West Nova Scotia Regiment, in Aldershot
 1st (Halifax-Dartmouth) Field Artillery Regiment, RCA, in Halifax
 33 (Halifax) Service Battalion, in Halifax
 84th Independent Field Battery, RCA, in Yarmouth
 20th Field Engineer Squadron, in Halifax
 Cape Breton Militia District, in Sydney (Merged with the Western Nova Scotia Militia District in 1992)
 1st Btn, The Nova Scotia Highlanders (North), in Truro
 2nd Btn, The Nova Scotia Highlanders (Cape Breton), in Sydney
 45th Field Engineer Squadron, in Sydney
 35 (Sydney) Service Battalion, in Sydney
 Newfoundland Militia District, in St. John's
 1st Btn, Royal Newfoundland Regiment, in St. John's
 2nd Btn, Royal Newfoundland Regiment, in Grand Falls-Windsor
 3rd Field Artillery Regiment, RCA, in St. John's
 56th Field Engineer Squadron, in St. John's
 36 (Newfoundland) Service Battalion, in St. John's
 Prince Edward Island Militia District, in Charlottetown (Merged with the Eastern New Brunswick Militia District in 1992)
 The Prince Edward Island Regiment (RCAC), in Charlottetown

Quebec Militia Area 
 Quebec Militia Area, in Montreal covering Quebec
 Montreal Militia District (Milice du district 1 du Québec), in Montreal
 The Royal Canadian Hussars (Montreal), in Montreal
 Le Régiment de Hull (RCAC), in Gatineau
 The Canadian Grenadier Guards, in Montreal
 The Black Watch (Royal Highland Regiment) of Canada, in Montreal
 4th Battalion, Royal 22e Régiment (Châteauguay), in Laval
 6th Battalion, Royal 22e Régiment, in Saint-Hyacinthe
 Les Fusiliers Mont-Royal, in Montreal
 Le Régiment de Maisonneuve, in Montreal
 The Royal Montreal Regiment, in Westmount
 2e Régiment d'artillerie de campagne, ARC, in Montreal
 3e Régiment du génie, in Westmount
 51 (Montreal) Bataillon des services, in Montreal
 Sherbrooke Militia District (Milice du district 2 du Québec), in Sherbrooke (Merged with the Quebec Militia District)
 Sherbrooke Hussars, in Sherbrooke
 Les Fusiliers de Sherbrooke, in Sherbrooke
 52 (Sherbrooke) Bataillon des services, in Sherbrooke
 Quebec Militia District (Milice du district 3 du Québec), in Quebec City
 12e Régiment blindé du Canada (Militia), in Trois-Rivières
 Les Voltigeurs de Québec, in Quebec City
 Les Fusiliers du St-Laurent, in Rimouski
 Régiment de la Chaudière, in Lévis
 Le Régiment du Saguenay, in Saguenay (provides 2x airborne platoons and a company headquarters to the Airborne Regiment)
 6e Régiment d'artillerie de campagne, ARC, in Lévis
 62e Régiment d'artillerie de campagne, ARC, in Shawinigan
 55 (Quebec City) Bataillon des services, in Quebec City
 9e Escadron du génie, in Rouyn-Noranda
 10e Escadron du génie, in Sainte-Foy
 15e Escadron du génie, in Quebec City

Reserve units of the Royal Canadian Armoured Corps (RCAC) were equipped with Cougar and Grizzly armoured vehicles.
Reserve units of the Royal Regiment of Canadian Artillery (RCA) were equipped with 105mm C1 howitzers and 81mm mortars.

Air Command 
Canadian Forces Air Command (AIRCOM) unified all flying assets of the Canadian Armed Forces in one command. It provided combat-ready air forces for the surveillance and control over Canadian airspace and for the defence of North America. It also provided air groups for other commands:

 Maritime Air Group provided Maritime Command with anti-submarine helicopters and airplanes
 10 Tactical Air Group provided Force Mobile Command with tactical helicopters
 1 Canadian Air Division Canada's aerial contribution to NATO's aerial defense

The other air groups of Air Command remained under its operational control, however in case of war two of Fighter Group's fighter squadrons were assigned as reinforcement to 1 Air Division in Germany, while its other two fighter squadrons were assigned as air defence assets to the Canadian NORAD Region. Air Command fielded only two wings: 3 and 4 Wing, as part of 1 Air Division, to fulfill NATO operational requirements. All other units fell under operational control of the bases they operated from. A key unit of Air Command was 437 Transport Squadron, which in case of crisis would have flown Canadian reinforcements from 1 Canadian Mechanized Brigade Group to Germany to augment the strength of 4 Canadian Mechanized Brigade Group. Together with the US Air Force Air Command operated the Distant Early Warning Line of radar stations on the edge of Canada's arctic North. Beginning in 1988 the Distant Early Warning Line was upgraded with more powerful radars and automated to reduce personnel requirements.

 Headquarters Canadian Forces Air Command, at CFB Winnipeg
 CFB Penhold
 Canadian Forces School of Air Reserve Training
 Canadian Forces Junior Leader School
 CFB Summerside
 Canadian Forces Junior Leader School
 CFB Edmonton
 Canadian Forces School of Aeromedical Training
 Canadian Forces Survival Training School
 Canadian Forces School of Traffic and Movements
 CFB Borden (Canadian Forces Training System Base)
 Air Command Academy
 Canadian Forces Aircrew Selection Centre
 Canadian Forces School of Aerospace Technology and Engineering
 CFB North Bay
 Air Weapons Control and Countermeasures School
 Air Force Indoctrination School

Fighter Group/Canadian NORAD Region 

After the United States and Canada signed the North American Air Defence Modernization Agreement during the Shamrock Summit on 18 March 1985 Canada's air defence was undergoing a major restructuring: in 1987 Fighter Group was merged Canadian NORAD Region to create a unified air defence command for Canada. In the same year Canada began to replace the Distant Early Warning Line (DEW) radar sites across the Canadian Arctic with the more modern North Warning System (NWS) radars.

NWS stretched from Alaska across the Canadian Arctic at approximately the 70th parallel and extended down the Canadian East Coast to Labrador. Unlike the manned DEW radars the NWS radars consisted of minimally manned long-range radars and unmanned short-range gap-filler radars. Therefore, Canada began to disband its 19 radar squadrons, with only six being left by 1989, four of which were coastal radars: three on the East Coast and one on the West Coast. The original NWS plan called for the installation of a further four coastal radars along the Canadian West Coast and Southeast Alaska.

 Fighter Group/Canadian NORAD Region at CFB North Bay under operational control of NORAD
 CFB North Bay
 22 Radar Control Wing
 21 Aerospace Control and Warning Squadron operating Sector Operations Control Centre East
 12 Radar Squadron, at CFS Mont Apica
 23 Radar Squadron, at CFS Barrington (Coastal radar site)
 221 Radar Squadron, at CFS Sydney (Coastal radar site)
 226 Radar Squadron, at CFB Gander (Coastal radar site)
 51 Aerospace Control and Warning Squadron operating Sector Operations Control Centre West
 42 Radar Squadron, at CFB Cold Lake
 501 Radar Squadron, at CFS Holberg (Coastal radar site)
 414 Composite (Electronic Warfare) Squadron, CC-117 Falcon, replaced with CC-144 Challenger in 1989
 Canadian Forces Support Unit Colorado Springs, at NORAD HQ at Peterson Air Force Base
 Canadian Detachment Elmendorf, at Elmendorf Air Force Base
 Canadian NORAD Region Forward Operating Locations at Yellowknife, Inuvik, Rankin Inlet, Iqaluit and Kuujjuaq (expansion underway)
 CFB Cold Lake, one CF-18 squadron would have reinforced 3 Wing at CFB Baden–Söllingen in Germany
 Communication and Air Traffic Control Squadron
 410 Tactical Fighter Operational Training Squadron, CF-18 Hornet
 416 Tactical Fighter Squadron, CF-18 Hornet
 441 Tactical Fighter Squadron, CF-18 Hornet
 419 Tactical Fighter Training Squadron, CF-5D Freedom Fighter
 Maintenance Squadron
 4 Software Engineering Squadron, maintaining CF-18 Hornet soft- and hardware
 10 Field Technical Training Squadron, training CF-18 technicians
 CFB Bagotville, one CF-18 squadron would have reinforced 3 Wing at CFB Baden–Söllingen in Germany
 Communication and Air Traffic Control Squadron
 425e Escadron d'appui tactique, CF-18 Hornet
 433e Escadron d'appui tactique, CF-18 Hornet
 8 Air Communications and Control Squadron (deployable unit)
 Maintenance Squadron
 CFB Chatham
 Communication and Air Traffic Control Squadron
 434 Tactical Fighter Squadron, CF-5A Freedom Fighter, disbanded 17 March 1989
 Satellite Identification and Tracking Unit, at Detachment St. Margarets, part of NORAD's Space Object Identification Centre
 Maintenance Squadron

Maritime Air Group 

 Maritime Air Group, at CFB Halifax under operational control of Maritime Command
 CFB Shearwater
 Communication and Air Traffic Control Squadron
 406 Maritime Operational Training Squadron, CH-124 Sea King
 423 Helicopter Anti-Submarine Squadron, CH-124 Sea King
 443 Helicopter Anti-Submarine Squadron, CH-124 Sea King at Patricia Bay Heliport supporting Maritime Forces Pacific
 Maintenance Squadron
 CFB Greenwood
 Communication and Air Traffic Control Squadron
 404 Maritime Patrol and Training Squadron, CP-140 Aurora
 405 Maritime Patrol Squadron, CP-140 Aurora
 415 Maritime Patrol Squadron, CP-140 Aurora
 14 Software Development Unit, maintaining CP-140 Aurora soft- and hardware
 Maritime Proving and Evaluation Unit
 Maintenance Squadron
 CFB Comox
 Communication and Air Traffic Control Squadron
 33 Utility Squadron, CP-121 Tracker, CT-133 Silver Star (Training and Naval Gunnery Target Towing)
 407 Maritime Patrol Squadron, CP-140 Aurora
 442 Transport and Rescue Squadron, CC-115 Buffalo, CH-113 Labrador part of Air Transport Group
 Maintenance Squadron
 CFB Summerside
 Communication and Air Traffic Control Squadron
 413 Transport and Rescue Squadron, CC-115 Buffalo, CH-113 Labrador part of Air Transport Group
 420 Squadron (Air Reserve Unit twinned with 880 Maritime Reconnaissance Squadron)
 880 Maritime Reconnaissance Squadron, CP-121 Tracker
 Maintenance Squadron

10 Tactical Air Group 

 10 Tactical Air Group, at CFB St. Hubert under operational control of Mobile Command
 CFB Toronto
 Communication and Air Traffic Control Squadron
 400 Tactical Helicopter and Training Squadron (Air Reserve Unit), CH-136 Kiowa
 411 Tactical Helicopter Squadron (Air Reserve Unit), CH-136 Kiowa
 Maintenance Squadron
 CFB St. Hubert
 Communication and Air Traffic Control Squadron
 401 Tactical Helicopter and Training Squadron (Air Reserve Unit), CH-136 Kiowa
 430e Escadron tactique d'hélicoptères, CH-135 Twin Huey, CH-136 Kiowa supporting 5 Groupe-brigade mécanisé du Canada
 438e Escadron tactique d'hélicoptères (Air Reserve Unit), CH-136 Kiowa
 Maintenance Squadron
 CFB Gagetown, main Mobile Command training base
 Communication and Air Traffic Control Squadron
 403 Helicopter Operational Training Squadron, CH-118 Iroquois, CH-135 Twin Huey, CH-136 Kiowa
 Air Ground Operations School
 Maintenance Squadron
 Petawawa Heliport
 427 Tactical Helicopter Squadron, CH-135 Twin Huey, CH-136 Kiowa supporting Special Service Force

Air Transport Group 

 Air Transport Group at CFB Trenton
 CFB Trenton
 Communication and Air Traffic Control Squadron
 CFD Mountain View
 424 Transport and Rescue Squadron, CC-115 Buffalo, CC-138 Twin Otter, CH-113 Labrador
 426 Transport Training Squadron, CC-130E Hercules part of 14 Air Training Group
 436 Transport Squadron, CC-130E Hercules
 437 Transport Squadron, CC-137 Husky
 2 Air Movements Squadron (Ground airlift support unit)
 Maintenance Squadron
 Terminal Radar and Control Systems Support and Training Unit
 CFB Ottawa
 Communication and Air Traffic Control Squadron
 412 Transport Squadron, CC-144 Challenger (Canadian VIP Transport), CC-109 Cosmopolitan being replaced by CT-142 Dash 8
 450 Transport Helicopter Squadron, CH-147 Chinook, CH-135 Twin Huey part of 10 Tactical Air Group
 3 Air Movements Squadron (Ground airlift support unit)
 Maintenance Squadron
 CFB Edmonton
 Communication and Air Traffic Control Squadron
 408 Tactical Helicopter Squadron, CH-135 Twin Huey, CH-136 Kiowa part of 10 Tactical Air Group and supporting 1 Canadian Mechanized Brigade Group
 418 Squadron (Air Reserve Unit twinned with 440 Transport and Rescue Squadron)
 435 Transport and Rescue Squadron, CC-130E Hercules
 440 Transport and Rescue Squadron, CC-138 Twin Otter (Detachment at Yellowknife)
 447 Transport Helicopter Squadron, CH-147 Chinook part of 10 Tactical Air Group
 1 Air Movements Squadron (Ground airlift support unit)
 Maintenance Squadron
 Canadian Forces Parachute Maintenance Depot
 CFB Gander
 103 Rescue Unit, CH-113 Labrador

14 Air Training Group 

 14 Air Training Group, at CFB Winnipeg
 CFB Winnipeg
 Communication and Air Traffic Control Squadron
 402 Transport and Training Squadron (Air Reserve Unit), CT-142 Dash 8
 429 Transport Squadron, CC-130E Hercules part of Air Transport Group
 Central Flying School CT-134 Musketeer
 Canadian Forces Air Navigation School
 Canadian Forces School of Aerospace Studies
 Maintenance Squadron
 1 Construction Engineering Unit
 CFB Moose Jaw
 Communication and Air Traffic Control Squadron
 2 Canadian Forces Flying Training School, CT-114 Tutor
 431 Air Demonstration Squadron, 11x CT-114 Tutor
 Maintenance Squadron
 CFB Portage la Prairie
 Communication and Air Traffic Control Squadron
 Flying Instructors School, CT-134 Musketeer
 3 Canadian Forces Flying Training School, CT-134 Musketeer, CH-139 Jet Ranger
 Maintenance Squadron

Air Reserve 
The Air Reserve consisted of one group headquarters, two wings, seven squadrons, and augmentation flights at 9 bases. Air Reserve Group was formed in 1976 to administer the 950 air reserve personnel, although units responded operationally to the regular force commanders at their bases.

 Air Command, at CFB Winnipeg
 Air Reserve Group, at CFB Winnipeg
 1er Escadre, at CFB St. Hubert
 401 Tactical Helicopter and Training Squadron
 438 Tactical Helicopter Squadron
 2 Wing, at CFB Toronto
 400 Tactical Helicopter and Training Squadron
 411 Tactical Helicopter Squadron
 402 Transport and Training Squadron, at CFB Winnipeg
 418 Squadron, at CFB Edmonton, twinned with 440 Transport and Rescue Squadron
 420 Squadron, at CFB Summerside, twinned with 880 Maritime Reconnaissance Squadron
 Air Reserve Augmentation Flight Moose Jaw
 Air Reserve Augmentation Flight Portage la Prairie
 Air Reserve Augmentation Flight Summerside

Maritime Command 
Canadian Forces Maritime Command had its headquarters at CFB Halifax on Canada's Atlantic coast. It developed, trained and equipped Canada's naval forces. In wartime operational command would have been exerted by Commander Maritime Forces Atlantic (MARLANT) and Commander Maritime Forces Pacific (MARPAC) respectively. Commander of Maritime Forces Atlantic doubled-hatted as commander of NATO's Canadian Atlantic Sub-Area (CANLANT) command. CANLANT was an area command of Supreme Allied Commander Atlantic (SACLANT) and responsible to keep the Labrador Sea free from Soviet ships and submarines. As Soviet submarines passing under the ice of the Arctic Ocean and through the many channels of the Canadian Arctic Archipelago to reach the North Atlantic were seen as the biggest threat Canada's fleet fielded exclusively ships specialized in the anti-submarine role. Together with the US Navy Maritime Command operated a series the SOSUS underwater listening posts on the Atlantic Ocean's seabed to observe Soviet submarine operations in the Atlantic.

Air Command provided Maritime Command with a group of anti-submarine planes and helicopters. Maritime Command ships participated every year in NATO's Standing Naval Force Atlantic (STANAVFORLANT). After having built no new ships since 1973 Maritime Command began an ambitious construction program for 12 new Halifax-class frigates in 1987, the first of which began to enter service in 1992 and replaced all major surface combatants safe for the Iroquois-class destroyers.

 Canadian Forces Maritime Command (MARCOM), at CFB Halifax
 Canadian Forces Base St. John's
 Naval Station Argentia, joint Canadian-American SOSUS base
 Canadian Forces Station Shelburne, Canadian SOSUS base
 Canadian Forces Station Bermuda
 Canadian Forces Maritime Experimental and Test Ranges, in Nanoose Bay

Maritime Forces Atlantic 

 Maritime Forces Atlantic (MARLANT), at CFB Halifax
 Canadian Forces Base Halifax
 First Canadian Destroyer Squadron (CANDESRON 1):
 : 
 Fifth Canadian Destroyer Squadron (CANDESRON 5):
 : , 
 First Canadian Submarine Squadron (CANSUBRON 1):
 Reserve Training Unit Atlantic:
  boom defence vessels: , 
 HMCS Cormorant (ASL 20), diving support vessel
 HMCS Quest, oceanographic research/acoustic vessel
  replenishment oiler: , 
  minesweeper: , 
  icebreaker: 
  fireboat: 
 Fleet Diving Unit (Atlantic)
 Acoustic Data Analysis Centre (Atlantic)
 Canadian Forces Maritime Warfare Centre
 Canadian Forces Fleet School Halifax
 Meteorological and Oceanographic Centre Halifax
 Queen's Harbour Master Halifax
 Fleet Maintenance Group Atlantic
 Canadian Forces Ship Repair Unit (Atlantic)
 Naval Engineering Unit (Atlantic), CFB Halifax

Maritime Forces Pacific 

 Maritime Forces Pacific (MARPAC), CFB Esquimalt
 Canadian Forces Base Esquimalt
 Second Canadian Destroyer Squadron (CANDESRON 2):
 : 
 Fourth Canadian Destroyer Squadron (CANDESRON 4):
 Training Group Pacific:
  oceanographic research vessel: 
 , replenishment oiler
  tugboat
 : 
 : , 
  tugboat: , 
 , sail training vessel
 Fleet Diving Unit (Pacific)
 Canadian Forces Fleet School Esquimalt
 Meteorological and Oceanographic Centre Esquimalt
 Queen's Harbour Master Esquimalt
 HMCS Venture, the Naval Officers Training Centre
 Fleet Maintenance Group Pacific
 Canadian Forces Ship Repair Unit (Pacific)
 Naval Engineering Unit (Pacific), CFB Esquimalt

Naval Reserve 
The Naval Reserve consisted of 22 divisions in cities across Canada. In times of war the missions of naval reserve were the naval control of shipping, maritime coastal defence, and the clearance of mines.

 Maritime Command, at CFB Halifax
 Naval Reserve, at CFB Halifax
 , in Saint John
 , in St. John's
 , in Ottawa
 , in Kingston
 , in Saguenay
 , in Winnipeg
 , in Rimouski
 , in Vancouver
 , in Montreal
 , in Thunder Bay
 , in Windsor
 , in Sept-Îles, QuebecSept-Îles
 , in Victoria, British Columbia
 , in Quebec City
 , in Edmonton
 , in Regina
 , in Trois-Rivières
 , in Halifax
 , in Hamilton
 , in Calgary
 , in Saskatoon
 , in Toronto (activated 1989)

Canadian Forces Europe 

 Headquarters, Canadian Forces Europe (CFE), Canadian Forces Base Lahr, FRG
 Canadian Forces Element, HQ CENTAG, in Heidelberg
 Canadian Forces Element, HQ 4 ATAF, at Ramstein Air Base
 Canadian Forces Element, HQ AMF (L), in Mannheim
 Canadian Forces Element, NATO Airborne Early Warning Force, E-3A Component, at Geilenkirchen Air Base
 National Support Unit, at Geilenkirchen Air Base
 Communications Group Europe, CFB Lahr
 Communications Squadron Lahr
 Communications Squadron Baden-Söllingen
 Canadian Forces Network, CFB Lahr
 Canadian Forces Hospital Europe, CFB Lahr
 CFB Lahr
 CFB Baden-Söllingen
 311 Forward Mobile Support Unit, providing general logistic support to CFE
 Forward Storage Site for units that would have been dispatched to Germany in case of war in Zimmern ob Rottweil
 Ammunition Depot Lahr
 Ammunition Depot Söllingen
 Training Area Langenhard
 4 Air Defence Regiment, Royal Regiment of Canadian Artillery
 Headquarters & Service Battery, 4 Air Defence Regiment, RCA (2x M 577, 2x M113)
 127 Air Defence Battery (detached to 4 Canadian Mechanized Brigade Group), CFB Lahr (12x ADATS, 15x Javelin, 5x M113)
 128 Air Defence Battery (detached to 4 Wing), CFB Baden-Söllingen (4x ADATS, 8x 35mm Skyguard)
 129 Air Defence Battery (detached to 3 Wing), CFB Lahr (4x ADATS, 8x 35mm Skyguard)
 4 Air Defence Workshop

1 Canadian Division 
 1 Canadian Division (Forward), CFB Lahr, in war under CENTAG
 1st Canadian Division Headquarters and Signal Regiment (Forward), at CFB Lahr
 1st Canadian Division Intelligence Company, at CFB Lahr
 4 Canadian Mechanized Brigade Group, T CFB Lahr
 4 CMBG Headquarters & Signal Squadron, at CFB Lahr
 8th Canadian Hussars (Princess Louise's), at CFB Lahr (77x Leopard C1, 23x Lynx, 36x M113, 2x M577, 6x Bergepanzer)
 1er Btn, Royal 22e Régiment, at CFB Lahr (2x M577, 65x M113, 11x Lynx, 18x M113 TUA with TOW, 24x M125 with a 81mm mortar)
 3rd Btn, Royal Canadian Regiment, at CFB Baden-Söllingen (2x M577, 65x M113, 11x Lynx, 18x M113 TUA with TOW, 24x M125 with an 81mm mortar)
 1st Regiment, Royal Canadian Horse Artillery, at CFB Lahr (2x M577, 26x M109A4, 46x M113, 24x M548)
 4 Combat Engineer Regiment, at CFB Lahr (14x M113, 2x M577, 6x M548, 9x Badger AEV, 6x Biber bridgelayer)
 4 Service Battalion, at CFB Lahr (4x M113, 2x Bergepanzer, 6x MTV-R)
 4 Field Ambulance, at CFB Lahr
 4 Military Police Platoon, at CFB Lahr

In case of war 1 Canadian Division would have been reinforced by 5 Groupe-brigade mécanisé du Canada from CFB Valcartier, while 4 Canadian Mechanized Brigade Group would have been augmented with personnel from 1 Canadian Mechanized Brigade Group.

1 Canadian Air Division 
 1 Canadian Air Division, CFB Baden-Söllingen, in war under Fourth Allied Tactical Air Force
 3 Wing CFB Lahr
 3 Wing Operations
 3 Communication and Air Traffic Control Squadron
 4 Wing CFB Baden-Söllingen
 4 Wing Operations
 4 Communication and Air Traffic Control Squadron
 409 Tactical Fighter Squadron, CF-18 Hornet
 421 Tactical Fighter Squadron, CF-18 Hornet
 439 Tactical Fighter Squadron, CF-18 Hornet
 Air Reserve Augmentation Flight (Reserve Pilots)
 Training Flight, 5x CT-133 Silver Star
 1 Air Maintenance Squadron CFB Baden-Soellingen
 4 Construction Engineer Squadron, detached from Royal Canadian Engineers
 444 Tactical Helicopter Squadron CFB Lahr, CH-135 Twin Huey, CH-136 Kiowa part of 10 Tactical Air Group and supporting 4 Canadian Mechanized Brigade Group
 Detachment Lahr, 412 Transport Squadron from CFB Ottawa, 2x CC-142 Dash 8
 5 Air Movements Unit

In case of war 3 Wing would have been reinforced by two CF-18 Hornet squadrons based in Canada:
 416 Tactical Fighter Squadron or 441 Tactical Fighter Squadron from CFB Cold Lake
 425 Tactical Fighter Squadron or 433 Tactical Fighter Squadron from CFB Bagotville

Communication Command 
Canadian Forces Communication Command provided strategic communications for all services of the armed forces. It operated and maintained several data and voice communication networks. With an active force of 3,300 troops and 1,570 reservists Communication Command was the smallest of the armed forces commands.

Communication Command provided signal squadrons to the three brigades and Special Service Force of Mobile Command, as well signal support for Air Command bases. It also operated the Canadian contribution to the Five Eyes ECHELON signals intelligence network. However the Communications Security Establishment, which analysed intercepted material, was not part of Communication Command. The Canadian Government's Emergency Government Headquarters were also managed by Communication Command. Communication reserve units were grouped in six regional communication groups, which also contained active units based in the same region.

Communication Command Structure 
 Communication Command
 Canadian Forces School of Communications and Electronics, at CFB Kingston
 Canadian Forces Data Centre, at CFB Borden
 Canadian Forces Data Centre, at CFB Ottawa
 Communications Group Europe, at CFB Lahr, supporting Canadian Forces Europe
 Communications Squadron Lahr
 Communications Squadron Baden-Söllingen
 1st Canadian Division Headquarters and Signal Regiment (Main), supporting 1st Canadian Division
 1 CMBG Headquarters & Signal Squadron, at CFB Calgary, supporting 1 Canadian Mechanized Brigade Group
 4 CMBG Headquarters & Signal Squadron, at CFB Lahr, supporting 4 Canadian Mechanized Brigade Group
 5 CMBG Headquarters & Signal Squadron, at CFB Valcartier, supporting 5 Canadian Mechanized Brigade Group
 Special Service Force Headquarters & Signal Squadron, at CFB Valcartier, supporting Special Service Force
 CFS Carp (Emergency Government Headquarters)
 CFS Carp Almonte Detachment
 CFS Carp Dunrobin Detachment
 CFS Carp Richardson Detachment
 70 Communication Group, at CFB Toronto
 701 Communication Squadron, at CFS Carp
 702 Communication Squadron, at CFB Petawawa
 704 Communication Squadron, at CFB Rockcliffe
 706 Communication Squadron, at CFB Borden
 Detachment CFB Toronto
 Detachment CFB London
 707 Communication Squadron, at CFB North Bay
 708 Communication Squadron, at CFB Trenton
 Detachment CFB Kingston
 71e Groupe des communications, at CFB Montreal
 711 Escadron des communications, at CFB Valcartier
 Détachement CFB Bagotville
 Détachement CFS Moisie
 Détachement CFS Mont Apica
 715 Escadron des communications, at CFB Saint-Jean
 Détachement CFS Frobisher Bay
 72 Communication Group, at CFB Halifax
 720 Communication Squadron, at CFS Debert
 Detachment CFB Chatham
 Detachment CFB Summerside
 724 Communication Squadron, at CFB Gagetown
 Detachment CFB Moncton
 726 Communication Squadron, at CFB Halifax
 Detachment CFS Barrington
 Detachment CFB Cornwallis
 Detachment CFB Greenwood
 Detachment CFB Shearwater
 Detachment CFS Sydney
 727 Communication Squadron, at CFB St. John's
 Detachment CFB Gander
 Detachment CFB Goose Bay
 73 Communication Group, at CFB Winnipeg
 731 Communication Squadron, at CFB Shilo
 Detachment Regina
 Detachment CFB Moose Jaw
 733 Communication Squadron, at CFB Winnipeg
 Detachment CFS Churchill
 Detachment CFS Gypsumville
 74 Communication Group, in Vancouver
 740 Communication Squadron, at CFB Esquimalt
 Detachment CFB Comox
 Detachment CFB Chilliwack
 Detachment CFS Holberg
 742 Communication Squadron, at CFB Edmonton
 Detachment CFB Cold Lake
 Detachment CFB Wainwright
 Detachment CFS Yellowknife
 Detachment CFS Whitehorse
 743 Communication Squadron, at CFB Penhold
 Detachment CFB Suffield
 Detachment CFB Calgary
 747 Communication Squadron
 76 Communication Group, in Ottawa
 764 Communication Squadron, at CFB Ottawa
 Canadian Forces Cryptographic Maintenance Unit	
 Canadian National Distributing Authority
 1 Line Troop

Supplementary Radio System 
 Supplementary Radio System, at CFB Kingston (Canadian contribution to the Five Eyes ECHELON SIGINT network)
 2 Electronic Warfare Squadron, at CFB Kingston
 770 Communication Research Squadron, at CFB Gander
 771 Communication Research Squadron, at CFB Ottawa
 CFS Alert
 CFS Bermuda
 CFS Leitrim
 CFS Masset
 Detachment at Fort George G. Meade
 Detachment at Field Station Augsburg
 NRS Matsqui (MARPAC support element)
 NRS Aldergrove (MARPAC support element)
 NRS Newport Corner (MARLANT support element)
 NRS Mill Cove (MARLANT support element)
 CFB Winnipeg (AIRCOM support element)

Reserve Communication Units 
 Canadian Forces Communication Command
 70 Communication Group, at CFB Toronto
 700 Communication Squadron, at CFB Borden
 705 Communication Squadron, in Hamilton
 709 Communication Regiment, in Toronto
 772 Electronic Warfare Squadron, at CFB Kingston (Twinned with 2 Electronic Warfare Squadron)
 71e Groupe des communications, at CFB Montreal
 712 Escadron des communications, in Montreal
 713e Régiment des communications, in Beauport
 714 Escadron des communications, in Sherbrooke
 72 Communication Group, at CFB Halifax
 721 Communication Regiment, in Charlottetown
 Platoon-sized detachment in Glace Bay (former 725 Communication Squadron)
 722 Communication Squadron, in Saint John
 723 Communication Squadron, in Halifax
 728 Communication Squadron, in St. John's
 73 Communication Group, at CFB Winnipeg
 734 Communication Squadron, in Regina
 735 Communication Regiment, in Winnipeg
 736 Communication Squadron, in Thunder Bay
 737 Communication Troop, in Saskatoon
 74 Communication Group, in Vancouver
 741 Communication Squadron, in Victoria
 744 Communication Regiment, in Vancouver
 745 Communication Squadron, in Edmonton
 746 Communication Squadron, in Calgary
 748 Communication Troop, in Nanaimo
 749 Communication Troop, in Red Deer, Alberta
 76 Communication Group, in Ottawa
 763 Communication Regiment, in Ottawa
 765 Communication Squadron, in Ottawa

Canadian Forces Health Services Group 
The Canadian Forces Health Services Group consisted of the Canadian Forces Medical Service, the Dental Branch and their reserve units.

 Canadian Forces Health Services Group, in Ottawa
 Canadian Forces Medical Services School, at CFB Borden
 Canadian Forces Dental Services School, at CFB Borden
 Canadian Forces School of Operational Medicine, in Toronto
 National Defence Medical Centre, in Ottawa
 Canadian Forces Health Service Training Centre
 Canadian Forces Hospital Cold Lake, at CFB Cold Lake
 Canadian Forces Hospital Halifax, at CFB Halifax
 Canadian Forces Hospital Oromocto, at CFB Gagetown
 Hôpital des Forces canadiennes Valcartier, at CFB Valcartier
 Canadian Forces Hospital Europe, CFB Lahr, part of Canadian Forces Europe
 Central Medical Equipment Depot, at CFB Petawawa
 Regional Medical Equipment Depot, at CFB Borden
 Regional Medical Equipment Depot, at CFB Calgary
 Regional Medical Equipment Depot, at CFB Chilliwack
 Regional Medical Equipment Depot, at CFS Debert
 Dépôt régional de matériel médical, at CFB Valcartier
 Canadian Forces Medical Service
 1 Canadian Field Hospital, at CFB Petawawa
 1 Field Ambulance, at CFB Calgary, supporting 1 Canadian Mechanized Brigade Group
 2 Field Ambulance, at CFB Petawawa, supporting Special Service Force
 4 Field Ambulance, at CFB Lahr, supporting 4 Canadian Mechanized Brigade Group
 5 Field Ambulance, at CFB Valcartier, supporting 5 Canadian Mechanized Brigade Group
 Dental Branch
 1 Dental Unit, at CFB Ottawa providing dental care for units in the National Capital Region
 11 Dental Unit, at CFB Esquimalt providing dental care for Maritime Forces Pacific units
 12 Dental Unit, at CFB Halifax providing dental care for Maritime Command units
 13 Dental Unit, at CFB Trenton providing dental care for Canadian Forces Training System units
 14 Dental Unit, at CFB Winnipeg providing dental care for Air Command units
 15 Dental Unit, at CFB St. Hubert providing dental care for Mobile Command units
 35 Dental Unit, at CFB Lahr providing dental care for Canadian Forces Europe units

Reserve Medical Units 
 Canadian Forces Medical Service
 11 Medical Company, in Victoria
 12 Medical Company, in Vancouver
 15 Medical Company, in Edmonton (with a detachment in Calgary)
 16 Medical Company, in Regina
 17 Medical Company, in Winnipeg
 18 Medical Company, in Thunder Bay
 23 Medical Company, in Hamilton (detachments in London and Windsor)
 25 Medical Company, in Toronto
 26 Medical Company, in
 28 Medical Company, in Ottawa (with a detachment in North Bay)
 35 Medical Company, in Sydney (with detachments in Halifax, Saint John and St. John's)
 51 Compagnie médicale, in Montreal
 52 Compagnie médicale, in Sherbrooke
 55 Compagnie médicale, in Quebec City

Canadian Forces Training System 
The Canadian Forces Training System provided individual training for the operational commands. It operated 18 schools on five training bases and three schools on other commands' bases. Its strength was around 4,500 active members, 2,400 of which were instructors. Another 500 military instructors from other commands served as incremental staff. The training system was under
the jurisdiction of the Assistant Deputy Minister (Personnel), whose mandate also included the National Defence College, the Military Colleges and the Staff Colleges. The Canadian forces also provided training facilities for allied nations.

 Canadian Forces Training System
 CFB Toronto (Air Command Base)
 Canadian Forces College
 CFB Kingston
 Royal Military College of Canada
 Canadian Forces School of Communications and Electronics
 Canadian Forces School of Intelligence and Security
 CFB Chilliwack
 Canadian Forces School of Military Engineering
 Canadian Forces Officer Candidate School
 CFB Borden
 Canadian Forces School of Administration and Logistics
 Canadian Forces School of Aerospace and Ordinance Engineering
 Canadian Forces School of Aerospace Technology and Engineering
 Canadian Forces School of Electrical and Mechanical Engineering
 Canadian Forces Fire Academy
 Canadian Forces Military Police Academy
 Canadian Forces Nuclear, Biological and Chemical School
 Canadian Forces School of Music
 Canadian Forces School of Physical Education and Recreation
 Canadian Forces Language School (Borden)
 Canadian Forces Training Development Centre
 CFB St. Jean
 Collège militaire royal de St. Jean
 École des récrues des Forces canadiennes (Canadian Forces Recruit School (St. Jean))
 École de language des Forces canadiennes (St. Jean) (Canadian Forces Language School (St. Jean))
 École de perfectionnement en gestion des Forces canadiennes (Canadian Forces Management Development School )
 École technique des Forces canadiennes (Canadian Forces Technical School)
 CFB Cornwallis
 Canadian Forces Recruit School (Cornwallis)
 CFB Penhold (Air Command Base)
 Canadian Forces Leadership Academy
 CFB Ottawa (Air Command Base)
 Canadian Forces Language School (Ottawa)
 School of Military Mapping
 Canadian Forces Training Material Production Centre, at CFB Winnipeg

Land equipment and aircraft totals

Equipment of Mobile Command 
In 1989 Mobile Command fielded the following equipment:

 114x Leopard C1 main battle tanks (77x deployed to Germany)
 966x M113 armoured personnel carriers and variants (349x deployed to Germany)
 195x Cougar reconnaissance and fire support vehicles
 274x Grizzly wheeled armoured personnel carriers
 172x Lynx reconnaissance vehicles (60x deployed to Germany)
 233x 105mm towed howitzers (C1 howitzers and M 56 howitzers) (10x forward deployed to Germany for Canada's contribution to AMF(L))
 76x M109A4 self-propelled howitzers (26x deployed to Germany)
 149x BGM-71 TOW launchers (44x deployed to Germany)

Air Command Inventory 

The inventory of the Air Command in 1989 consisted of the following aircraft:

 Fighters:
 92x CF-18 Hornet
 39x CF-18B Hornet
 81x CF-5A/D Freedom Fighter, (Some stored)
 Maritime Patrol:
 18x CP-140 Aurora
 CP-140A Arcturus, (3x on order)
 18x CP-121 Tracker, (Retired in 1990 after the introduction of the CP-140A Arcturus)
 32x/2x CH-124A/U Sea King
 Transport/Tanker Aircraft:
 5x CC-137 Husky, (Only two could be equipped as aerial refueling tanker at the same time)
 Transport Aircraft:
 20x/7x CC-130E/H Hercules
 16x CC-144 Challenger, (9x VIP, 1x Trials, 6x Electronic warfare)
 2x CT-142 Dash 8, (2 more delivered in 1989, 2 more in 1990/91, replacing the CC-129 Dakota)
 7x CC-109 Cosmopolitan
 7x CC-117 Falcon, (Taken out of service on 19 November 1989)
 Tactical Transport Helicopters:
 61x CH-136 Kiowa
 44x CH-135 Twin Huey, (Some stored)
 7x CH-147 Chinook
 Search and Rescue Aircraft:
 14x CH-113 Labrador
 14x CC-115 Buffalo
 7x CC-138 Twin Otter
 9x CH-118 Iroquois
 Training Aircraft:
 118x Canadair CT-114 Tutor (Some stored)
 58x Canadair CT-133 Silver Star
 20x Beechcraft CT-134 Musketeer
 14x Bell CH-139 Jet Ranger

Notes

References 

 Isby, David C.; Kamps, Charles T. (1985). Armies of NATO's Central Front, London: Jane's Information Group. ISBN 0-7106-0341-X. Includes Force Mobile Command, Militia, and Air Command listings of units for 1984-5, which are useful as additional sources.

External links 
 Militia Districts (see 1968–1991)
 Canadian Armed Forces Annual Historical Reports

Military units and formations of Canada
Military history of Canada
Wikipedia outlines